The 1963 Ball State Cardinals football team was an American football team that represented Ball State College (later renamed Ball State University) in the Indiana Collegiate Conference (ICC) during the 1963 NCAA College Division football season. In its second season under head coach Ray Louthen, the team compiled a 5–3 record (4–2 against ICC opponents) and finished in second place out of seven teams in the ICC. 

The team was led on offense by halfback Merv Rettenmund, who later played Major League Baseball for the Baltimore Orioles.

Schedule

References

Ball State
Ball State Cardinals football seasons
Ball State Cardinals football